The Daily Orange, commonly referred to as The D.O., is an independent student newspaper published in Syracuse, New York. It is free and published daily during the Syracuse University academic year.

It was one of the first college papers to become fully independent from its parent college. Its alumni work at nearly every major newspaper in the nation — The New York Times, Los Angeles Times, The Washington Post, The Wall Street Journal, The Philadelphia Inquirer, The Dallas Morning News, The Boston Globe — in a variety of reporting, editing, design and photography roles.

Publisher reported circulation for 2018 was 6,000 copies, with a weekly online circulation of about 45,000. The paper's print edition is published Monday, Wednesday and Thursday during the academic year, but content is published online daily during the academic year. The Tuesday print edition was dropped starting in fall 2018 to focus on digital content.

History

Early years

The first copy of the newspaper was published on September 15, 1903. Irving R. Templeton, co-founder of the Orange Publishing Company, served as the founding editor of the newspaper. The newspaper set up operations in the Steele Hall, and accepted advertising. From 1903 until at least 1922, a copy cost two cents and the annual subscription cost $2.50 annually, and all students received mandatory subscription.

Syracuse was the third university after Brown and Columbia to have a printing shop owned and operated by students and the first university to own it completely. The printing plant was owned by a corporation known as the Orange Publishing Company, the directors and stockholders of which were all students. The newspaper even manufactured its own paper with the help of SU students from the College of Forestry.<ref>{{cite news |title=Syracuse's Daily Orange" Manufactures Own Paper |url=https://www.newspapers.com/clip/64226057/ |access-date=5 December 2020 |work=The Daily Tar Heel |date=15 February 1941 |location=Chapel Hill, North Carolina |page=4 }}</ref>The D.O. operated as the official university paper but often had fractious relationship with the administration.

In 1910, The D.O. published an issue that was managed by an all-female team, which later became an annual tradition. In 1939, Elizabeth C. Donnelly, of Syracuse, became the first female to be elected the editor-in-chief.

In 1927, The D.O. started carrying news of the world affairs through the United News Press service making it one the few college papers to do so.
In 1933, it was ranked amongst the best college newspapers.

Towards independence
In the mid-1960s, student newspapers all over the U.S. began pressing for separation from the control of the university administration. The D.O. was considered part of SU; the administration had installed a paid business manager and sold advertising to assure enough money to print every day. The administration could possibly influence the content of the paper based on financial holds, which created friction between the administration and the paper. This relationship was further strained by The Daily Orange criticism over how the school handled highly charged situations such as the racism on the football team and the Vietnam protests. In the summer of 1970, The D.O. briefly stopped printing due to lack of financial support.

A major turning point in D.O. history occurred in 1971. In April 1971, the university refused to back The D.O. in a $938,000 libel suit, and also decided to install a new editor without the input of the D.O. staff. In May 1971, the editorial staff decided to sever the ties that existed with the administration.

On October 26, 1971, the 'new' D.O. was formed by a merger of The Daily Orange daily (revolutionary socialist) and two weeklies  Dialog (moderate) and Promethean (Liberal Democratic). The new paper became a student organization that received funding for production costs from the Student Government Association (now known as the Student Association). A referendum vote determined whether the student body would continue to contribute a portion of its fee.

Full independence
In December 1991, editor-in-chief Jodi Lamagna and her staff decided to refuse any further funding from SGA. In the process, The D.O. became one of the few completely independent student newspapers in the country. Since then, The D.O. has operated with complete financial independence from the university, raising funds necessary for publishing a daily paper through advertising revenue and fundraising. Though it still maintains a business relationship with the university, in regards to its status as a student group and its housing agreement, its relationship with administrators has no bearing on its editorial content.

In 1999, the D.O. editors and then SU Chancellor Kenneth Shaw signed an agreement giving The D.O. rights to deliver papers on campus, the ability to lease 744 Ostrom Ave from the university as an office building, and access to all university buildings and administrators necessary for reporting purposes.

In 2005, The D.O. underwent a layout redesign to give paper renewed sense of ‘identity’. This revamp included new logo partially designed by Jim Parkinson.

In 2019, the paper moved its office from 774 Ostrom Ave to 230 Euclid Ave due to SU construction plans.

CIA lawsuit
In the early 1980s, The Daily Orange was a plaintiff in a lawsuit against the CIA. The D.O. had sued the CIA to obtain documents relating to alleged CIA activity on campus during the late 1960s and early 1970s. Syracuse lost the case when district judge Howard G. Munson ruled that the issues were exempt from disclosure.

ComicsThe D.O. was the first student newspaper to have comics. The paper has produced many famous cartoonists, such as Vaughn Bodē, Robb Armstrong (creator of Jump Start), Brad Anderson (creator of Marmaduke), Steve Ellis and Nicholas Gurewitch (creator of The Perry Bible Fellowship). Pulitzer Prize winner Jim Morin served as editorial cartoonist during his senior year at SU.

Awards and rankings
The paper has in the past decade won numerous awards, including more than a dozen "story of the year" awards in several categories from the Associated Collegiate Press and top-story honors from the William Randolph Hearst Foundation.

The Princeton Review has ranked the D.O. the best college newspaper every year since 2016.The D.O. was named the best all-around student newspaper in the country by the Society of Professional Journalists in 2017. It is also the best-designed student newspaper in the country, as voted at the University of Missouri Student Society for News Design awards in 2005.

In 2021, College Choice ranked the D.O. #2 in the nation.

Notable alumni

Robb Armstrong, author of Jump Start comic strip
Jessica Cutler, photo editor, The WashingtonienneMeredith Goldstein, Living|Arts writer, The Boston GlobeNicholas Gurewitch, author of The Perry Bible Fellowship comic strip, The GuardianMike Kelly, columnist, The RecordLarry S. Kramer, former president and publisher, USA TodayMichael Kranish, political reporter, The Washington PostSteve Kroft, journalist & long-time correspondent for 60 MinutesJerre Mangione, writer and scholar of the Sicilian-American experience
Jim Morin, Pulitzer Prize winning editorial cartoonist, Miami HeraldJeff Passan, national baseball writer, ESPN
Jayson Stark, national baseball writer, The Athletic and MLB Network contributor
Eli Saslow, Pulitzer Prize winning reporter at The Washington PostIn popular culture
In the September 20, 2018 episode of the TV game show Jeopardy!'', a clue in the category "Orange You Glad" was, "First published in 1903, the Daily Orange is this New York university's student newspaper".

References

External links

Official Archives
"Daily Orange online history exhibit from Syracuse University archives"
"Daily Orange gallery 1979-1980"

Daily newspapers published in New York (state)
Independent newspapers published in the United States
Newspapers published in Syracuse, New York
Publications established in 1903
Student newspapers published in New York (state)
Syracuse University